Jayme Tiomno (April 16, 1920 in Rio de Janeiro – January 12, 2011 in Rio de Janeiro) was a Brazilian experimental and theoretical physicist with interests in particle physics and general relativity. He was member of the Brazilian Academy of Sciences and a recipient of the Brazilian Order of Scientific Merit. He was the son of Jewish Russian immigrants.

He was  a  founder  of the CBPF - Centro Brasileiro de Pesquisas Físicas (Brazilian Center of Physics Research) and  one responsible for the creation of the Brazilian Physical Society.

Selected bibliography

References

External links
 Jayme Tiomno Biography. Brazilian Academy of Sciences.

1920 births
2011 deaths
Brazilian physicists
Brazilian nuclear physicists
Members of the Brazilian Academy of Sciences
Recipients of the Great Cross of the National Order of Scientific Merit (Brazil)
Brazilian Jews
Brazilian people of Russian-Jewish descent
University of São Paulo alumni
21st-century Brazilian scientists
20th-century Brazilian scientists